The 1943 VFL Grand Final was an Australian rules football game contested between the Richmond Football Club and Essendon Football Club, held at the Princes Park in Melbourne on 25 September 1943. It was the 45th annual Grand Final of the Victorian Football League, staged to determine the premiers for the 1943 VFL season. The match, attended by 42,100 spectators, was won by Richmond by a margin of 5 points, marking that club's fifth VFL premiership victory.

Teams

 Umpire – Eric Hawkins

Statistics

Goalkickers

References
AFL Tables: 1943 Grand Final

See also
 1943 VFL season

VFL/AFL Grand Finals
Grand
Richmond Football Club
Essendon Football Club
September 1943 sports events